The University of Florida's (UF) online forensic science distance education programs cater to working professionals and students who have completed their Bachelor of Science degrees.

The program offers six areas of concentration, each as a certificate and/or master's degree. The faculty involved in these programs represent the fields of forensic science, toxicology, DNA & serology, drug chemistry, environmental forensics, death investigation, and veterinary forensics.

Each course within UF's program is conducted online and is made up of specific topic modules. Most modules contain course notes supplemented with images, animations, and case studies. Students are provided constant access to course modules, which are released over the duration of the UF semester.

Degree and certificate programs currently offered

UF currently offers four Master of Science (MS) programs, and six graduate certificates in forensic science.

Degree programs

 MS in Forensic Toxicology
 MS in Drug Chemistry
 MS in Forensic DNA & Serology
 MS in Forensic Science (with core courses and electives)

Certificate programs

 Environmental Forensics
 Forensic Death Investigation
 Forensic Toxicology
 Drug Chemistry
 Forensic DNA & Serology
 Veterinary Forensic Sciences

Certificate programs

Environmental Forensics
The graduate certificate in environmental forensics is offered by the UF College of Pharmacy. It offers courses in collaboration with the University of Canberra in Australia. The certificate is designed to give the environment law enforcement officer a background in the principles of contaminant analysis and transport in the environment with the ultimate aim of determining liability for pollution.

Forensic Death Investigation
The graduate certificate in death investigation is provided by the UF College of Pharmacy. This certificate provides courses in collaboration with UF's College of Liberal Arts and Sciences department of anthropology and the University of Edinburgh College of Medicine. It focuses on the investigation of crime and death using forensic pathology, anthropology, and DNA analysis. Modules in sexual offenses, drug health, forensic odontology, and wounds are also featured.

Forensic Toxicology, Drug Chemistry, and Forensic DNA & Serology
These graduate certificates are similar to the master's program concentrations offered by the university and are typically 15 credits of graduate coursework that can then be transferred toward the MS degree. These certificates provide students with foundations in various aspects of forensic science.

Veterinary Forensic Sciences
The University of Florida's Maples Center for Forensic Medicine offers a graduate certificate in veterinary forensic sciences.  This program consists of five courses at the MS level with a focus on the application of forensic science and medicine to veterinary medical sciences.  This program is in partnership with the University of Florida College of Veterinary Medicine and the American Society for the Prevention of Cruelty to Animals (ASPCA). It is the only program of its type in the United States. The program is unique for its application of forensic science and medicine to veterinary medicine and animal related crimes including animal cruelty cases.

Wildlife Forensic Sciences
The University of Florida's Maples Center for Forensic Medicine offers a graduate certificate in wildlife forensic sciences.  This program consists of three courses at the MS level with a focus on the application of forensic science and medicine to wildlife crime. It is the only program of its type in the United States. The program is unique for its application of forensic science and medicine to crime against wildlife including illegal trafficking and poaching.

Rankings and Recognitions

 The UF online forensic science program has over 700 graduates and students from 33 different countries who are either enrolled or have completed their master's degree.
 Program director Dr. Ian Tebbett, Ph.D., was awarded the Irving Award by ADEC in 2011 and the 2010 Outstanding Leadership Award by the U.S. Distance Learning Association.

About the University of Florida

 The University of Florida is the fourth largest academic institution in the US. It is accredited by both the Southern Association of Colleges and Schools (SACS) and the Association of American Universities (AAU).
 UF enrolls more than 6,500 distance students and has more than 330,000 alumni throughout the world.

See also

 University of Florida clinical toxicology distance education program
 University of Florida pharmaceutical chemistry distance education program

References

External links
 

University of Florida
Distance education institutions based in the United States
1999 establishments in Florida